David West is a retired American soccer goalkeeper who played professionally in the Continental Indoor Soccer League and National Professional Soccer League.

On December 15, 1989, the Memphis Rogues of the American Indoor Soccer Association signed West.  In 1990, Memphis moved to the Sunbelt Independent Soccer League.  During the 1991 Sunbelt Independent Soccer League season, West and fellow Memphis goalkeeper Daniel Gonzalez were the top rated goalkeeper combo.  In 1994, West played for the Houston Hotshots in the Continental Indoor Soccer League.  In 1995, he saw not playing time before being placed on the disabled list in August.  That fall, he moved to the Tampa Bay Terror of the National Professional Soccer League for one season.  In 1998, he played one game for the Dallas Sidekickes in the Premier Soccer Alliance.

References

External links
 Dallas Sidekicks: David West

Living people
1967 births
American soccer players
American Indoor Soccer Association players
Continental Indoor Soccer League players
Dallas Sidekicks (WISL) players
Houston Hotshots players
Cleveland Crunch (original MISL) players
Memphis Storm players
National Professional Soccer League (1984–2001) players
Premier Soccer Alliance players
USISL players
Tampa Bay Terror players
Association football goalkeepers